Salveyn is a surname. Notable people with the surname include:

Anthony Salveyn, Master of University College, Oxford (1557–58), probably the brother of Richard
Richard Salveyn, Master of University College, Oxford (1547–51)

See also
Salvin